Ralph Earle may refer to:

Ralph Earle (ambassador) (1928–2020), American diplomat and arms control negotiator
Ralph Earle (American naval officer) (1874–1939), American naval officer
Ralph Earle (politician) (1835–1879), British politician
Ralph Earle Jr. (1908–1995), American biblical scholar

See also
Ralph Earl (1751–1801), American artist